The 2020–21 FC Ural Yekaterinburg season was Ural's club's eighth successive season in the Russian Premier League, the highest tier of association football in Russia. Ural Yekaterinburg finished the season in 12th position, and where knocked out of the Russian Cup at the Round of 16 stage by Ufa.

Season events
On 28 July, Ural extended their loan deal with Ihor Kalinin for another season, and extended their contract with Yuri Bavin.

On 5 August, Ilya Pomazun joined Ural on loan for the season from CSKA Moscow.

On 1 September, Stefan Strandberg returned to Ural after leaving Trapani. The following day, Ural announced the signing of Branko Jovičić from Red Star Belgrade.

On 16 October, Ural re-signed Pavel Pogrebnyak.

Squad

Out on loan

Transfers

In

Loans in

Out

Loans out

Released

Friendlies

Competitions

Overview

Premier League

Results summary

Results by round

Results

League table

Russian Cup

Round of 32

Round of 16

Squad statistics

Appearances and goals

|-
|colspan="14"|Players away from the club on loan:
|-
|colspan="14"|Players who appeared for Ural Yekaterinburg but left during the season:

|}

Goal scorers

Clean sheets

Disciplinary record

References

FC Ural Yekaterinburg seasons
Ural Yekaterinburg